Zhao Ji is a Paralympian athlete from China competing mainly in category T54 sprints events.

Zhao competed in the 2004 Summer Paralympics in both the 4x100 and 4x400 for the Chinese team. In the 2008 Summer Paralympics in his home country he competed across the range of events competing in the 100m, 800m and marathon and was part of the gold medal-winning Chinese team in both the 4 × 100 m and 4 × 400 m. Among his teammates were Cui Yanfeng, Zhang Lixin, Zong Kai, and Li Huzhao.

References

Paralympic athletes of China
Athletes (track and field) at the 2008 Summer Paralympics
Paralympic gold medalists for China
Living people
Year of birth missing (living people)
Chinese male sprinters
Chinese male wheelchair racers
Medalists at the 2008 Summer Paralympics
Paralympic medalists in athletics (track and field)